Titanosuchus ferox ("Fierce titan crocodile") is an extinct species of dinocephalian therapsids that lived in the Middle Permian epoch in South Africa.

Along with its close relatives, Jonkeria and Moschops, Titanosuchus inhabited present-day South Africa around 265 million years ago, in the Late Permian. Titanosuchus was a carnivore which measured over 2.5 m long and might have eaten both Jonkeria and Moschops, among other vertebrates. Its teeth included sharp incisors and fang-like canines, perfect for biting prey.

Titanosuchus should not be confused with the therapsid Eotitanosuchus, which belonged to a different family.

Parascapanodon and Scapanodon were once thought to be distinct genera, but are now considered to be junior synonyms of Titanosuchus.

See also

 List of therapsids

References

Tapinocephalians
Prehistoric therapsid genera
Guadalupian synapsids of Africa
Fossil taxa described in 1876
Taxa named by Richard Owen
Capitanian genera